Cregya is a genus of checkered beetles in the family Cleridae. There are over 100 described species in Cregya.

Selected species
 Cregya mixta (LeConte, 1866)
 Cregya oculata (Say, 1835)
 Cregya quadrinotata (Chevrolat, 1874)
 Cregya quadrisignata (Spinola, 1844)

References

Cleridae